Avenida de la Paz is a station on Line 4 of the Madrid Metro. It is located in fare Zone A.

References 

Line 4 (Madrid Metro) stations
Railway stations in Spain opened in 1979
Buildings and structures in Ciudad Lineal District, Madrid